Halcyon Monitoring Solutions, Inc. was a software company who provided software products and services for monitoring infrastructure in the data center or the cloud.  The company's software monitors the health, performance, and availability of heterogeneous hardware and software, including servers, storage, networking devices, operating systems and applications.  Halcyon specializes in the technologies of the Oracle Corporation.
Halcyon provides software products and services for managing IT infrastructure in the data center. Halcyon's software monitors the health, performance, and availability of heterogeneous hardware and software, including physical and virtual servers, storage, networking devices, operating systems and applications.

History
Halcyon was founded in 1994 by software engineers at SystemWare Innovation Corporation (SWI).  In 1996, Halcyon entered into an agreement with Sun Microsystems, which was acquired by Oracle, to co-develop Sun Enterprise SyMON 2.0,  based on Halcyon's PrimeAlert technology.  The product was renamed to Sun Management Center and was Sun's framework for monitoring and managing its hardware and the Solaris operating system including Solaris Zones/Containers, and Logical Domains (LDoms - now known as Oracle VM Server for SPARC).

Halcyon provided add-on software for Sun Management Center to extend its capabilities to include monitoring for other operating systems such as Microsoft Windows, Linux, and IBM AIX in addition to storage (NetApp, EMC) and networking devices (Cisco Systems, Brocade Communications Systems, Hitachi) and some applications (Oracle DB, Sybase, various App and Web Servers).

In addition, Halcyon also announced light-weight standalone software called Neuron, which also supported all the add-ons created for Sun Management Center. Neuron included common ITIL related components such as asset management, change management, configuration management, compliance, capacity planning,  virtualization and public cloud management.

Software companies based in Washington (state)
Companies based in Bellevue, Washington
Defunct software companies of the United States
American companies established in 1994